RS9 Vampir is a semi-automatic pistol produced by Tehnički remont Bratunac in Republika Srpska. It is first pistol produced by TRB. On its receiver it has a Picatinny rail for possible installation of tactical lamps and other accessories, located in front of the trigger.

References 

9mm Parabellum semi-automatic pistols
Semi-automatic pistols of Serbia